Shooting at the 2007 Southeast Asian Games was held at Shooting Range, Sport Authority of Thailand Sport Complex, Bangkok, Thailand.

Medal table

Medalists

Men

Women

External links
Southeast Asian Games Official Results

2007 Southeast Asian Games events
2007 in shooting sports
2007
Shooting competitions in Thailand